Marine Forensic Science is forensic science applied to legal issues involving marine life. It also refers to the scientific study of incidents or accidents occurring as a result of or involving bodies of water including oceans, streams or rivers, lakes, or ponds.  Marine forensics uses law enforcement to protect fisheries resources, marine mammals, and endangered species. Pollution from rapid industrialization and other human activities caused declination in fisheries resources and coral reefs have threatened marine life. On October 21, 1972, the Marine Mammal Protection Act of 1972 (MMPA) was enacted, was enacted, protecting fisheries resources, marine mammals, and endangered species. DNA analysis plays a vital role in marine forensics, considering the flesh and blood of marine species in investigations. However, maritime taphonomy also affected the accuracy of the results. Thus, a marine scientist is essential to be observant and cautious at all times during investigations.

History 
Marine forensics dates from the 1970s when Congress passed the series of acts that protected fisheries, marine mammals, and endangered species, called the Marine Mammal Protection Act.

The Marine Mammal Protection Act of 1972

At first, the act aimed to prevent the population of whales, seals, and porpoises from dropping exponentially by the disturbance of human activities. It focuses on preventing the number one cause of death among marine mammals which is the accidental capture in commercial fishing and subsequent fishing line entanglement. After 1994, the act “prohibits acts or attempts of harassment, killing, and capturing marine mammals without prior approval with a permit.”

However, these are the certain exceptions to the act:

 Pre-MMPA specimens taken before December 21, 1972
 International Agreements entered into by the United States before December 21, 1972
 Alaska natives
 Scientific research, public display, enhancing the survival or recovery of a species, and incidental take in commercial fisheries
 Waivers granted by the U.S. Government

The first International Marine Forensics Symposium was held in April 2002 at Washington, DC

Threats
Threats towards marine forensics involves radioactive and chemical pollution from rapid industrialization, fisheries and coral reefs in decline, and global warming and carbon balanced that can no longer be kept since the water is very polluted compared from back then making the water unable to absorb as much carbon-dioxide as before and increase risks of global warming to occur

Training 
Due to the complications in the process, a marine forensics scientist is required to have certain sets of skills such as the way to ask appropriate questions, how to work with uncooperative witnesses, and the understanding the specific goals of the company’s incident investigation program. Investigators also need background on how incidents evolve and the myriad events and attributes which can cause or contribute to the severity of an incident

Types of Evidence 
Types of evidence varies from freshly frozen fish fillets to pieces of bones. In 2012,  researchers at the Virginia Institute of Marine Science shows that test can be taken on seafood to identify the ocean’s origin of blue marlin

Data Acquisition
DNA analysis is an essential tool in forensics science. The process involves collecting and testing evidences in laboratories, along with analyzing evidences such as blood samples, dried tissue, fish fillets, and fish scales.

Controversies 
Maritime taphonomy impacts the accuracy in results in forensics. Also, 80% and more maritime incidents are caused by human error.

Related Laboratories and Organizations

National Oceanic and Atmospheric Administration(NOAA) 
The NOAA is the only laboratory in the United States for marine forensics

Northwest Fisheries Science Center (NWFSC) 
Northwest Fisheries Science Center is a part the National Oceanic and Atmospheric Administration(NOAA) informally known as NOAA Fisheries. NWFSC also help NOAA Fisheries Office of Law Enforcement protect consumer interests. The agency also help to ensure that high consumer interest would not result in the rising of illegal activities such as food fraud.

Virginia Institute of Marine Science (VIMS) 
“VIMS provides research, education, and advisory service in marine science to Virginia, the nation, and the world.” The research team members of VIMS includes Laurie Sorenson(graduate student), Jan McDowell(molecular biologist), and John Graves(professor).

Marine Accident Investigation Branch (MAIB) 
Marine Accident Investigation Branch is an independent division of the United Kingdom’s Department for Transport, Local Government and the Regions(DTLR).

Office of the National Coordinator for Health Information Technology (ONC) 
“ONC is the principal federal entity charged with coordination of nationwide efforts to implement and use the most advanced health information technology and the electronic exchange of health information. “

See also 

 Wildlife forensics

External links
Marine Forensics Symposium

References 

Marine